United Nations Security Council resolution 1250, adopted unanimously on 29 June 1999, after reaffirming all resolutions on the situation in Cyprus, particularly Resolution 1218 (1998), the Council addressed the Secretary-General Kofi Annan's mission of good offices in Cyprus.

The security council reiterated its concern at the lack of progress towards a political settlement of the Cyprus dispute. It stressed its full support for the mission of good offices of the secretary-general with the goal of reducing tension and promoting progress towards a resolution in Cyprus. Both the Republic of Cyprus and Northern Cyprus had concerns which would be addressed in the negotiations.

The resolution requested the secretary-general to invite the two leaders of the communities on Cyprus to negotiations in the autumn of 1999. The two leaders were urged to commit themselves to the following principles:

(a) no preconditions;
(b) all issues on the table;
(c) continue to negotiate until a settlement is reached;
(d) consideration of United Nations resolutions and treaties.

They were also required to create a positive climate on the island in the run-up to negotiations in autumn 1999. Finally, the secretary-general was requested to report to the council by 1 December 1999 concerning developments in Cyprus. Resolution 1251 adopted the same day extended the mandate of the United Nations Peacekeeping Force in Cyprus.

See also
 Annan Plan for Cyprus
 Cyprus dispute
 List of United Nations Security Council Resolutions 1201 to 1300 (1998–2000)
 Turkish Invasion of Cyprus

References

External links
 
Text of the Resolution at undocs.org

 1250
 1250
1999 in Cyprus
Cyprus peace process
June 1999 events